Gonzalo Ezequiel Menéndez (born 16 December 1992) is an Argentine footballer. He was born in Avellaneda (Buenos Aires), Argentina and currently plays for 12 de Octubre in Paraguay.

External links
 
 

1992 births
Living people
Argentine footballers
Argentine expatriate footballers
Arsenal de Sarandí footballers
Deportivo Merlo footballers
Audax Italiano footballers
Coquimbo Unido footballers
KF Shkëndija players
Juventud Antoniana footballers
Deportivo Santaní players
Nueva Chicago footballers
12 de Octubre Football Club players
Paraguayan Primera División players
Argentine Primera División players
Primera Nacional players
Torneo Federal A players
Chilean Primera División players
Primera B de Chile players
Macedonian First Football League players
Argentine expatriate sportspeople in Chile
Expatriate footballers in Chile
Argentine expatriate sportspeople in Paraguay
Expatriate footballers in Paraguay
Argentine expatriate sportspeople in North Macedonia
Expatriate footballers in North Macedonia
Association football midfielders
Sportspeople from Avellaneda